"If You Want Me to Stay" is a 1973 hit single by Sly and the Family Stone, from their album Fresh.

Background
Stone recorded the song without much input from the rest of the band; by the early 1970s, he had begun crafting most of his material by himself. An alternate version of "If You Want Me to Stay", as well as most of the rest of the Fresh album, was completed before Stone decided to scrap the masters and re-record the album. These alternate versions have surfaced in underground markets, online auctions, and specialty shops. However, five bonus tracks are included in Epic's 2007 reissue of Fresh, all of which are directly from the alternate mix of the album.

Song analysis
The lyrics of "If You Want Me to Stay" feature frontman Sly Stone informing his lover that she has to let him be himself, otherwise he feels that he would have to leave. The composition has its origins in an apology Stone wrote to his future wife, Kathleen Silva, after a fight.

Chart performance
"If You Want Me to Stay" was the band's final Top 20 pop hit, and is the best-known of its post-There's a Riot Goin' On recordings.  The single reached number 12 on the Pop Chart, and number three on the Billboard R&B Singles Chart.

Personnel
 Sly Stone — vocals, guitar, piano, organ, bass guitar
 Andy Newmark — drums
 Cynthia Robinson — trumpet
 Jerry Martini — saxophone
 Pat Rizzo — saxophone

Note: A transcription of the bass part for this song appears in the October 2006 issue of Bass Player magazine (pages 78–81).  According to the article "Rustee Allen’s Complete Bass Line: Sly & The Family Stone's 'If You Want Me To Stay'" accompanying the transcription, written by Chris Jisi:

"The ambitiously named 'Fresh' hit the streets in early July. A stripped-down, more raw outing than previous Sly albums, the 11-track set was boosted by the bass waves of Graham's hand-picked replacement, Rustee Allen. Sly himself laid down some of the album's bass tracks."

Mica Paris cover 

British soul singer Mica Paris released a version of "Stay" in 1998, as the lead single from the album Black Angel. Her version spent two weeks on the UK Singles Chart before peaking at number forty  on May 16, 1998. It also reached the top forty of the New Zealand Singles Chart.

Track listing 
CD single

Credits and personnel 
Performers
 Vocals - Mica Paris
 Backing Vocals – Jackie Farris, Jackie Gouche, Jackie Smiley
 Bass – Raphael Saadiq
 Drum Programming – Richie Stevens
 Guitar – Keven Frost
 Keyboards – Pete Adams
 Remix – Richie Stevens
 Saxophone [Tenor] – Ben Castle
 Trumpet – Raul D'Oliveira

Charts

Cover versions
The song has been covered extensively since its introduction, by artists including Etta James, Eric Benet, Mercury Rev, Victor Wooten, Soulive, Pama International, Ronny, Kermit Ruffins, and the Red Hot Chili Peppers. The song has also been featured in the movies Made in Heaven, Talk to Me, Dead Presidents, and Money Talks.

In 2020, Ari Lennox and Anthony Ramos released a cover in partnership with Main Street Alliance — a nonprofit organization committed to supporting small businesses in the United States — and Crown Royal in donation to help the landmark small businesses and communities all over the country.

Sample
As with most of Sly Stone's work, many songs have sampled the bass line from "If You Want Me to Stay", including:
Dre' Dog, aka Andre Nickatina, in his 1991 album The New Jim Jones in the song "Summer in Florida".
Dana Dane from the 1990 album Dana Dane 4 Ever in the song "Tales from the Dane Side".

References 

1973 singles
Sly and the Family Stone songs
Prince (musician) songs
Red Hot Chili Peppers songs
Song recordings produced by Sly Stone
Songs written by Sly Stone
1973 songs
Epic Records singles
Mica Paris songs
1998 singles